In molecular biology mir-592 microRNA is a short RNA molecule. MicroRNAs function to regulate the expression levels of other genes by several mechanisms.

Expression in cancers
Significantly altered expression of miR-592 has been observed between tumours deficient and proficient for mismatch repair in colon cancer. Expression levels are lower in the proficient form compared to the deficient, with a more than two-fold change. This altered expression has been proposed to reflect a reversion to regulatory programs seen in earlier undifferentiated and proliferative developmental states.

miR-592 expression is also altered in hepatocellular carcinoma; it has been shown to be downregulated along with nine other microRNAs.

See also 
 MicroRNA

References

Further reading

External links
 

MicroRNA
MicroRNA precursor families